Dwyer Brothers Stable was an American thoroughbred horse racing operation owned by Brooklyn businessmen Phil and Mike Dwyer.

The Dwyer brothers hired trainer Evert Snedecker and purchased their first Thoroughbred, Rhadamanthus, in 1874. In October of that same year they acquired Vigil from Col. David McDaniel who to that point had earned $5630. In the ensuing few months of 1876 the colt won another $20,160 and was chosen that year's retrospective American Champion Three-Year-Old Male Horse.

Other trainers who worked for the Dwyers were James G. Rowe, Sr. and Frank McCabe.  The Dwyers won the 1881 Kentucky Derby with future U.S. Hall of Fame colt Hindoo and finished second with Runnymede the following year.  However, they had their greatest racing success in the Belmont Stakes in their hometown, winning the classic event five times. One of the few major races at tracks in the New York/New Jersey area that they never won was the Brooklyn Handicap.

The brothers, either together or individually, owned a number of prominent horses, including Hindoo, Bramble, Bella B., Luke Blackburn, Bonnie Scotland, George Kinney, Miss Woodford, Barnes, Hanover, Raceland, Tremont, Ben Brush, and Cleophus. Mike Dwyer was a partner in Kingston.

In 1886 they were a key part of the group of investors who formed the Brooklyn Jockey Club and built the Gravesend Race Track at Gravesend on Coney Island. The brothers racing partnership was dissolved in 1890  and Mike Dwyer went on to enjoy further success. He won the Kentucky Derby  for the second time in 1896 with Ben Brush, ridden by jockey Willie Simms.

The Brooklyn Derby, founded in 1887, was renamed the Dwyer Stakes in their honor in 1918.

Dwyer Brothers U.S. Champions (retrospective)

 Horse of the Year: Hanover (1887)
 Champion Two-Year-Old Male Horse: Tremont (1886)
 Champion Three-Year-Old Male Horse: Vigil (1876), Hindoo (1881), Runnymede (1882), Inspector B. (1886), Hanover (1887), Sir Dixon (1888)
 Champion Three-Year-Old Filly: Bella B. (1888)
 Champion Older Male Horse: Kingston (1889)

Dwyer Brothers Stable major race wins

Kentucky Derby
1881 : Hindoo
1896 : Ben Brush

Preakness Stakes
1899 : Half Time

Belmont Stakes
1883 : George Kinney
1884 : Panique
1886 : Inspector B
1887 : Hanover
1888 : Sir Dixon

Travers Stakes
1881 : Hindoo
1883 : Barnes
1886 : Inspector B.
1888 : Sir Dixon
1890 : Sir John

References

American companies established in 1876
American companies disestablished in 1890
American racehorse owners and breeders
Owners of Kentucky Derby winners
Owners of Preakness Stakes winners
Owners of Belmont Stakes winners
Companies based in Brooklyn
Horse farms in the United States
1876 establishments in New York (state)
1890 disestablishments in New York (state)